Luzhki is a rural locality (a selo) in Starodubsky District, Bryansk Oblast, Russia. The population was 455 as of 2010. There are 7 streets.

Geography 
Luzhki is located 37 km southwest of Starodub (the district's administrative centre) by road. Voronok is the nearest rural locality.

References 

Rural localities in Starodubsky District